June Beebe Atwood (March 27, 1913 – November 10, 2003) was an American golfer.

She was born in Chicago, Illinois. She won the Women's Western Open 1931 and 1933, and finished second in 1930 and to Jane Weiller 1932. She competed in college for the Northwestern Wildcats. She also competed under her married name, Mrs. Phillip Atwood. She also won the Chicago Women's District Golf Association's Championship twice, in 1933 and 1935.

Major championships

Wins (2)

References

American female golfers
Winners of LPGA major golf championships
Golfers from Chicago
1913 births
2003 deaths
20th-century American women
20th-century American people
21st-century American women